The term base flow may refer to:

 Baseflow in hydrology
 Base flow (random dynamical systems) in the study of random dynamical systems in mathematics